"If Only" is a remake song recorded by South Korean singer and Red Velvet member Joy featuring Paul Kim. Originally recorded and released by singer Sung Si-kyung in 2002, the song was re-recorded and was released on May 31, 2021, by SM Entertainment as a track from her special remake album Hello. Composed and written by Yoon Young-joon, the song features a sound band arrangement and a flute performance. The song debuted at position 69 on South Korea's Gaon Digital Chart and charted at position 38 on the Billboard K-Pop 100.

Background and composition 
According to SM Entertainment, Joy will be releasing "If Only" for her special album Hello at 6:00 PM of May 31, 2020. It was reported that Paul Kim will be featuring on the song. Through Red Velvet's official social media accounts, a mood sampler, track poster, and teaser image of the track were released on the midnight of May 24. Joy revealed on Yoo Hee-yeol's Sketchbook that she thought of Paul Kim as the featuring artist on the song as soon as she heard the news that the track will be done on a duet. The song is a remake of the same name released by singer Sung Si-kyung in 2002.

"If Only" was composed and written by Yoon Young-joon. It was reported that Joy and Paul Kim will be presenting a "sweet duet harmony". The song will include their "sweet voice" and "clear vocals" that will create the track's "affectionate and romantic atmosphere. It will feature a sound band arrangement. The song will also present a "soft" flute performance. Moreover, it was outlined that the track will have a "sweet harmony". The song is composed in the key of G minor with a tempo of 97 beats per minute.

Promotion and reception 
A live video for "If Only" was released on June 6, 2021. The song debuted at position 69 on the 23nd weekly issue of South Korea's Gaon Digital Chart for 2021 during the period dated May 30 – June 5. The track also debuted at position 15 on the component Download Chart. It also debuted at position 90 on the component Streaming Chart and peaked at 79. The song entered the Billboard K-Pop 100 at position 48 on the chart issue dated June 19, 2021. The following week, it charted at position 38 on the chart issue dated June 26, 2021.

Credits and personnel 
Credits adapted from the liner notes of Hello.

Studio

 Recorded at MonoTree Studio
 Recorded at 821 Sound
 Engineered for mix at SM SSAM Studio
 Mixed at SM Blue Ocean Studio
 Mastered at 821 Sound Mastering

Personnel

 Joyvocals
 Yoon Young-joonsongwriting, composition
 Hwang Hyunarrangement, vocal directing, keyboard, digital editing
 Kim Byung-sukbass
 Jeong Su-wanguitar
 Park Ki-hoonflute
 Kwon Ae-jinbackground vocals
 Kim Hae-ronbackground vocals
 Kang Sun-youngrecording, digital editing
 Kim Min-heerecording
 Lee Kyung-joondigital editing
 Kang Eun-jimixing engineer
 Kim Chul-soonmixing
 Kwon Nam-woomastering

Charts

Release history

References 

2002 songs
Joy (singer) songs